Povo Brasileiro is the second studio album by the Brazilian Reggae band Natiruts. The album was produced by Liminha. Povo Brasileiro has been certified gold by the Associação Brasileira dos Produtores de Discos (ABPD), for selling 100,000 copies.

Track listing

Certifications

References

1999 albums
Portuguese-language albums
Natiruts albums